Caroline Augusta Furness Jayne (July 3, 1873 – June 23, 1909) was an American ethnologist who published the first book on string figures in 1906 titled String Figures: A Study of Cat's Cradle in Many Lands.

Early life and education
Jayne was born on July 3, 1873, the youngest of the four children and only daughter of Shakespearean scholar Horace Howard Furness and author Helen Kate (Rogers) Furness. She grew up in the family's house in Washington Square in Philadelphia, and at Lindenshade, their summer house in Wallingford, Pennsylvania. She graduated from the Agnes Irwin School.

Career
Jayne became interested in string figures through her brother, William Henry Furness III's anthropology work with Alfred Haddon studying native cultures where string game figures were used.

Jayne was the first to create a popular study of string figures built on academic papers from journals such asThe Annual Report of the Bureau of Ethnology. the Proceedings of the Royal Geographical Society and other foreign language anthropological journals. She also personally recorded string figures from several native groups that were in attendance at the 1904 World's Fair in St. Louis, Missouri.

Jayne published the first book on string figures in 1906 titled String Figures and How to Make Them. The book provided instructions on how to create 129 string figures that were identified by anthropologists studying traditional societies such as those in Congo-Kasai and the Caroline Islands.

The 1906 book review from the Journal of Education:

Personal life, death and legacy
On October 10, 1894, she married Horace Jayne, a zoologist and professor at the University of Pennsylvania. Together they had two children, Kate Furness Jayne (b. 1895) and Horace H. F. Jayne (b. 1898).

They built a house in Philadelphia at 19th & Delancey Streets, designed by her uncle, the architect Frank Furness, now known as the Horace Jayne House. They also built a summer house in Wallingford, Pennsylvania, "Sub Rosa" (again designed by her uncle), on the grounds of her father's summer house. Following Jayne's early death at age 36, her husband and children lived year-round at "Sub Rosa".

In her memory, her father commissioned a Tiffany window for the First Unitarian Church of Philadelphia. The window features a portrait of her holding a lily.

In 1910, her friend, the poet Florence Earle Coates, wrote a poem in her memory.

Her son, Horace H. F. Jayne, was the first curator of Chinese art at the Philadelphia Museum of Art, worked as director of the University of Pennsylvania Museum of Archaeology and Anthropology and as vice director of the Metropolitan Museum of Art.

Bibliography
String Figures: A Study of Cat's Cradle in Many Lands, Charles Scribner's Sons, New York, 1906

Gallery

See also
List of string figures

Citations

Sources

External links
 

Caroline Furness Jayne (1873-1909)

1873 births
1909 deaths
20th-century American women writers
Agnes Irwin School alumni
American anthropology writers
American ethnologists
Burials at Laurel Hill Cemetery (Philadelphia)
Furness family
String figures
Women ethnologists
Writers from Philadelphia